Garraunbaun is a mountain in Laois, in the Republic of Ireland.

See also
List of mountains in Ireland

References

Mountains and hills of County Laois
Geography of County Laois